The Democratic Alliance  (AD) is a political coalition created to face the government of Nicolás Maduro in the 2020 Venezuelan parliamentary election and grouped in the National Assembly. It is made up of Hope for Change, Cambiemos and Progressive Advance parties of the predecessor coalition Agreement for Change, in addition to the intervened parties Democratic Action and Copei, and the later incorporated Primero Venezuela, United Venezuela, Ecological Movement, Unidad Vision Venezuela, Country Commitment and the also intervened Popular Will.

AD is the successor coalition of the Agreement for Change, and later also of the United Venezuela Alliance.

History

Creation and origin 
On 4 September 2020, representatives of five political parties of the Venezuelan opposition met with the CNE to formalize the nominations of candidates for the questioned parliamentary elections that will be held on  6 December 2020. The coalition was called the Democratic Alliance, whose main characteristic is that the directives of the main opposition parties (AD, VP, COPEI) were changed via the Supreme Court, after a document was introduced in the judicial body requesting the creation of a new ad-hoc board of directors and thus their electoral cards will be enabled to participate in the elections.

On 8 September 2020, in a ceremony held with the presence of national and international media, Javier Bertucci, president of the El Cambio party, announced a new unit called "Democratic Alliance" to participate in the controversial 2020 parliamentary elections. The alliance has the purpose of achieving the departure of the Maduro government with an "electoral, democratic and constitutional" route, through active participation in the upcoming elections (governors and mayors), and then call a recall referendum.

Political actions 
Juan Carlos Alvarado, general secretary of Copei, said that the alliance nominated candidates in the 2020 parliamentary elections in the 24 state lists and 87 electoral districts of the country. He mentioned that said alliance has a structure to defend the vote in the 14,509 voting centers and the more than 35,000 polling stations enabled for the elections to be held on 6 December 2020.

The Ecological Movement joins the Democratic Alliance in some states such as Amazonas, Cojedes, Delta Amacuro, Lara, Mérida, Miranda, Nueva Esparta, Táchira, Trujillo, Vargas and Zulia.

On December 9, the CNE published on its official website the bulletin that awards the 274 deputies by voting National, Regional and Nominal Lists. The coalition obtained the majority of the opposition votes, obtaining 1,169,363, representing 18.76% of the total participation.

Subsequently, the dissident parties of Primero Venezuela of the deputies Luis Parra and José Brito, United Venezuela of the alternate deputy Chaim Bucarán and the judicially intervened party Popular Will of the also alternate José Gregorio Noriega were incorporated.

Composition 
At present, the Alliance is made up of 27 political parties, mentioned below:

Electoral results

Parliamentary elections

See also 

 Operación Alacrán

References

External links 

 El Cambio website
 Acción Democrática website
 Copei website
 Cambiemos website
 Avanzada Progresista website

Political party alliances in Venezuela
Political parties established in 2020